Bukovice may refer to places in the Czech Republic:

Bukovice (Brno-Country District), a municipality and village in the South Moravian Region
Bukovice (Náchod District), a municipality and village in the Hradec Králové Region
Bukovice, a village and administrative part of Jeseník in the Olomouc Region

See also
Bukowice (disambiguation) 
Bukowski (disambiguation)